Charles Landon may refer to:

Charles Landon (cricketer) (1850–1903), English cricketer
Charles N. Landon (1878–1937), American illustrator
Charles Paul Landon (1760–1826), French paint